Kolbjørnsvik is a village in Arendal municipality in Agder county, Norway. The village is located on the northern part of the island of Hisøya, across the harbour from the town of Arendal. The former municipality of Hisøy had its municipal government located in this village. Today, the village is considered to be part of the town of Arendal, so separate population statistics are not kept.

Media gallery

References

Villages in Agder
Arendal